Subadyte is a genus of marine polychaete worms belonging to the family Polynoidae, the scaleworms. Eight species of Subadyte are recognised and the genus is known to occur widely in the world's oceans from the intertidal zone to depths of about 1200 m.

Description
Subadyte are short-bodied worms with around 35–41 segments and 15–16 pairs of elytra. The lateral antennae are positioned ventrally on the prostomium, directly beneath the median antenna and the neurochaetae bear bidentate tips.

Species
As at October 2020 Subadyte contains eight species:

Subadyte albanyensis Hanley & Burke, 1990
Subadyte campechensis Barnich, Beuck & Freiwald, 2013
Subadyte chesterfieldensis Hanley & Burke, 1991
Subadyte mexicana Fauchald, 1972
Subadyte micropapillata Barnich, Sun & Fiege, 2004
Subadyte mjoebergi (Augener, 1922)
Subadyte papillifera (Horst, 1915)
Subadyte pellucida (Ehlers, 1864)

References

Phyllodocida